Taras Ilnytskyi (born 4 March 1983) is a Ukrainian football manager and former defender.

Career
Born in Burshtyn in Prykarpattia, Ilnytskyi is a product of FC Dynamo Kyiv football academy. However his first professional experience he received playing for club Enerhetyk from his hometown. His debut in the Ukrainian Premier League he made with FC Zakarpattia Uzhhorod in 2004, with which he earned promotion in previous season. Since then and until 2009 Ilnytskyi played at the Ukrainian top league.

In 2013 Ilnytskyi returned for short period of time to professional football playing for new Crimean club Zhemchuzhyna, after which he retired.

In summer of 2014 he joined the Dynamo football academy as a coach. In 2016 Ilnytskyi was a senior coach of FC Arsenal Kyiv U-19 team. Since October 2018 he manages Chaika from the Kiev suburbs.

In 2019 Ilnytskyi was distinguished with the coach of the round honor in the Ukrainian Second League.

References

External links
Profile on Official Tavriya website 

1983 births
Living people
People from Burshtyn
Ukrainian footballers
Ukrainian Premier League players
FC Enerhetyk Burshtyn players
FC Dynamo-3 Kyiv players
FC Dynamo-2 Kyiv players
FC Hoverla Uzhhorod players
FC CSKA Kyiv players
FC Arsenal Kyiv players
SC Tavriya Simferopol players
FC Zhemchuzhyna Yalta players
Ukrainian football managers
SC Chaika Petropavlivska Borshchahivka managers
Association football defenders
Sportspeople from Ivano-Frankivsk Oblast